Tri Ta (born 1973) is an American politician currently serving as a member of the California State Assembly. He represents Assembly District 70, which consists of much of the Little Saigon area of northwestern Orange County He previously served as Mayor of Westminster.

Early life and education
Ta was born in Saigon in Vietnam (now Ho Chi Minh City). In 1992, he and his parents immigrated to the United States as refugees. Ta was 19 at the time.

Political career
Ta served as a city councilor in Westminster before being elected mayor. He became mayor in 2012 and was the city's first Vietnamese-American mayor. Ta was reelected in 2018. He is a Republican and has advocated for the Republican Party to take a greater interest in Vietnamese voters. Vietnamese Americans traditionally voted Republicans, but Democrats have made gains recently, especially in Orange County.

In 2019, Ta attracted publicity for clashing with other members of Westminster's city council. He and fellow council members Kimberly Ho and Chi Charlie Nguyen frequently sparred with the remaining members. Notably, they passed a controversial resolution alleging that the Vietnamese government was improperly interfering in city politics. This dispute culminated in the three voting to change the council's procedures over the objections of other members. Opponents of the three councilors filed for a recall election in response. In April 2020, Ta and his allies survived the recall attempt.

In January 2022, Ta announced his intention to run for election to the California State Assembly in district 70, which was being vacated by incumbent Janet Nguyen. He placed second in the top-two primary in June and faced Garden Grove City Councilwoman Diedre Thu-Ha Nguyen in the November general election. That same year, a council dispute over renewing Westminster's sales tax placed the city at risk of bankruptcy. Ta was also censured for false statements he made about other councilors.

In November 2022, Ta won the election to the California State Assembly. He took office in December.

Electoral history

References 

American people of Vietnamese descent
California politicians of Vietnamese descent
California Republicans
Living people
People from Westminster, California
Mayors of places in California
Vietnamese emigrants to the United States
1973 births
Asian conservatism in the United States
Republican Party members of the California State Assembly